Sayyid Ahmad Ali Khan (died 30 October 1824), popularly known as Walla Jah or Ahmad Ali Khan of Murshidabad, was the Nawab of Bengal and Bihar. He succeeded his half-brother, Zain-ud-Din Ali Khan, after he died on 6 August 1821, without a male issue. Walla Jah was the Nawab of Bengal from 1821 to 1824.

Life

Early years
Ahmad Ali Khan, better known as Walla Jah, was the second son of Baber Ali Khan by his second principal wife. He succeeded his half brother, Zain-ud-Din Ali Khan after his death on 6 August 1821 as the Nawab Nazim of Bengal and Bihar under the titles of Baeran ul-Mulk (Administrator of the country), Ihtisham ud-Daulah (Dignifier of the country), Walla Jah (Of High Rank) and Nahabat Jang (Horror in War).

Death and succession
Walla Jah had a short reign of just three years from 1821 until his death on 30 October 1824 at Murshidabad Palace. He was buried at Jafarganj Cemetery and was succeeded by his only child, Mubarak Ali Khan II as the Nawab of Bengal and Bihar.

Marriage

Principal wives
Nawab Nazim Ahmad Ali Khan had only one principal wife as follows:
 Nawab Najib-un-nisa Begum Sahiba. She was a Gaddinashin Begum. She died at Murshidabad Palace on 23 August 1858 and was buried at Jafarganj Cemetery.

Mut‘ah wives
The following is a list of the mut‘ah wives of Nawab Nazim Ahmad Ali Khan and some additional information about them:
 Name  : Misri Khanum (d. Before-23 September 1837)
 Name  : Fatima Khanum
 Name  : Bibi Rahim-un-nisa
 Name  : Bibi hayat-un-nisa

Children
Walla Jah had only one child, who was born as a son by his only principal wife, Najib-un-nisa Begum. He was Mubarak Ali Khan II who succeeded Walla Jah as the Nawab Nazim of Bengal and Bihar.

See also
List of rulers of Bengal
History of Bengal
History of India

References

External links
  Site dedicated to Nawab Nazim Walla Jah

Year of birth missing
19th-century rulers in Asia
Nawabs of Bengal
1824 deaths